Eduardo Damo Daquioag Jr. is a Filipino professional basketball player for the Terrafirma Dyip of the Philippine Basketball Association (PBA). He also played collegiate basketball with the UST Growling Tigers.

Early life and career
Eduardo Daquioag was born in Dingras, Ilocos Norte to a carpenter and housewife. He was scouted by UST Growling Tigers head coach, Pido Jarencio during his third year in high school while he was playing for the Ilocos Norte College of Arts and Trades at the Ilocos Regional Athletic Association. Jarencio was originally scouting Jeoff Javillonar but later was convinced to recruit Daquioag too along with Javillonar when they both finish high school.

High school career
UST assistant coach Beaujing Acot, brought Daquioag and Javillonar to the Benedictine International School where Acot was head coach of the school's basketball team. Daquioag won various titles with Benedictine International School including the 2008 National Students Basketball Championship in Cebu where he was named among the Mythical Five. When the school's basketball program was dissolved in 2009, Daquioag moved to Rizal Technological University where he played under the institution's junior team which was now headed by Acot.

College career
Eric Altamirano convinced Daquioag to study at the National University where the mentor was then newly appointed as the school's basketball head coach. Daquioag was unable to secure a slot at the NU Bulldogs and tried out to play for the UST Growling Tigers instead.

He made his debut for UST at the UAAP against the University of the East where his performance was well received. However his performance on the following games were lackluster and was benched in the following games. In his second year he was diagnosed with rheumatic fever, a potentially fatal disease and was forced to play limited minutes with the UST Growling Tigers on his second year. He returned to the team on his third year as a rotation player, and on his fourth year was named as a candidate for the MVP honor.

Professional career

PBA D-League
Daquioag was tapped to play with the Phoenix Petroleum Accelerators at the 2016 PBA D-League Aspirant's Cup. His team won the championship beating Café France-CEU Bakers in the final.

PBA
Daquioag was selected by the Meralco Bolts in the 2016 PBA draft.

On August 7, 2017, he was traded to the Rain or Shine Elasto Painters for Mike Tolomia.

On January 14, 2020, he was traded to the TNT KaTropa for three draft picks. On February 28, before appearing in a game for TNT, he was traded to the Blackwater Elite in a three-team deal involving TNT, Blackwater, and NLEX.

On December 24, 2021, he was traded to the Terrafirma Dyip for Justin Melton. 

During the 2022 Philippine Cup, he broke his right fibula, causing him to be out for the remainder of the conference.

On January 13, 2023, he signed a one-year contract extension with Terrafirma. He made his return during the 2023 Governors' Cup.

Career statistics

As of the end of 2022–23 season

PBA season-by-season averages

|-
| align=left rowspan=2| 
| align=left | Meralco
| rowspan=2|32 || rowspan=2|11.8 || rowspan=2|.465 || rowspan=2|.333 || rowspan=2|.750 || rowspan=2|1.8 || rowspan=2|1.1 || rowspan=2|.5 || rowspan=2|.0 || rowspan=2|5.3
|-
| align=left | Rain or Shine
|-
| align=left | 
| align=left | Rain or Shine
| 41 || 20.5 || .404 || .323 || .692 || 2.3 || 1.5 || .8 || .1 || 8.7
|-
| align=left | 
| align=left | Rain or Shine
| 46 || 20.4 || .396 || .298 || .653 || 2.3 || 1.7 || .8 || .2 || 7.6
|-
| align=left | 
| align=left | Blackwater
| 10 || 27.6 || .343 || .227 || .564 || 3.7 || 3.5 || .7 || .3 || 10.2
|-
| align=left rowspan=2| 
| align=left | Blackwater
| rowspan=2|23 || rowspan=2|23.1 || rowspan=2|.356 || rowspan=2|.260 || rowspan=2|.766 || rowspan=2|3.7 || rowspan=2|2.4 || rowspan=2|1.1 || rowspan=2|.3 || rowspan=2|8.0
|-
| align=left | Terrafirma
|-
| align=left | 
| align=left | Terrafirma
| 12 || 14.4 || .318 || .320 || .533 || 1.5 || 1.8 || .6 || .1 || 3.7
|-class=sortbottom
| align="center" colspan=2 | Career
| 164 || 19.1 || .392 || .296 || .681 || 2.4 || 1.7 || .8 || .2 || 7.3

College

Elimination rounds 

|-
| align="left" | 2010-11
| align="left" rowspan="5" | UST
| 14 || 9.2 || .400 || .235 || .500 || 1.4 || .9 || .6 || - || 2.7
|-
| align="left" | 2012-13
| 11 || 4.4 || .235 || .222 || 1.000 || .5 || .2 || .2 || - || 1.0
|-
| align="left" | 2013-14
| 14 || 24.4 || .433 || .243 || .615 || 4.5 || 2.5 || .6 || .4 || 8.8
|-
| align="left" | 2014-15
| 12 || 22.5 || .352 || .211 || .737 || 2.6 || 1.5 || 1.3 || .4 || 7.2
|-
| align="left" | 2015-16
| 14 || 34.5 || .422 || .171 || .682 || 5.6 || 2.2 || 1.1 || .8 || 16.4
|-class=sortbottom
| align="center" colspan=2 | Career
| 65 || 19.5 || .401 || .211 || .657 || 3.0 || 1.5 || .8 || .3 || 7.5

Playoffs 

|-
| align="left" | 2013-14
| align="left" rowspan="2" | UST
| 4 || 12.8 || .286 || .000 || 1.000 || 1.0 || 1.3 || .0 || .3 || 2.3
|-
| align="left" | 2015-16
| 4 || 32.9 || .326 || .111 || .750 || 5.8 || 2.0 || 1.0 || 1.0 || 10.8
|-class=sortbottom
| align="center" colspan=2 | Career
| 8 || 22.8 || .317 || .071 || .765 || 3.4 || 1.6 || .5 || .6 || 6.5

International career
While at the RTU, Daquioag was named into the Philippine national youth team led by head coach Eric Altamirano. He was also part of the amateur-laden senior Philippine national team that participated at the 2016 FIBA Asia Challenge.

References

1991 births
Living people
Basketball players from Ilocos Norte
Blackwater Bossing players
Filipino men's basketball players
Meralco Bolts draft picks
Meralco Bolts players
Philippine Basketball Association All-Stars
Philippines men's national basketball team players
Point guards
Rain or Shine Elasto Painters players
Rizal Technological University alumni
Shooting guards
Terrafirma Dyip players
UST Growling Tigers basketball players